Safet Osja (born 17 October 1975) is an Albanian retired footballer who last played as a midfielder for KS Ada Velipojë in the Albanian First Division.

Osja was previously with KS Vllaznia Shkodër and he played for them in the 2009–10 UEFA Europa League.

References

External links
 Profile – FSHF

1975 births
Living people
Footballers from Shkodër
Albanian footballers
Association football midfielders
Albania under-21 international footballers
KF Laçi players
KF Vllaznia Shkodër players
KF Elbasani players
KS Ada Velipojë players
Kategoria Superiore players
Kategoria e Parë players